Ermin Musić (born 28 May 1997) is a Bosnian professional footballer who plays as a centre-back for Drina Zvornik.

Honours
Sloboda Tuzla 
Bosnian Premier League runner up: 2015–16
Bosnian Cup runner up: 2015–16

References

External links
Ermin Musić at footballdatabase.eu

1997 births
Living people
Sportspeople from Tuzla
Association football central defenders
Bosnia and Herzegovina footballers
FK Drina Zvornik players
FK Sloboda Tuzla players
FK Tuzla City players
NK Zvijezda Gradačac players
Premier League of Bosnia and Herzegovina players
First League of the Federation of Bosnia and Herzegovina players
First League of the Republika Srpska players